Characovalva dentiens is a species of moth of the family Tortricidae. It is found in Costa Rica and Ecuador.

Subspecies
Characovalva dentiens dentiens (Costa Rica)
Characovalva dentiens micra Razowski & Becker, 2002 (Ecuador)

References

Moths described in 2000
Euliini
Moths of South America
Moths of Central America
Taxa named by Józef Razowski